Dougie Young was a singer and songwriter from South West Queensland. Young had a white father (Frank Young) and a Gurnu mother (Olive Kathleen née McCarthy).

Earlier in his life he worked as a stockman, during which he learnt the guitar and started writing songs. He married Christina Johnson on 11 December 1955 at St Therese's Catholic Mission Church at Wilcannia. A riding accident in 1957 ended his working as a stockman. In 1963 or 1964 Jeremy Beckett, an anthropologist made field recordings of Young, many of which were released in 1965 as an EP called Land Where the Crow Flies Backwards (Wattle). The title track has since been covered by Gary Shearston, Athol McCoy, Chad Morgan and Roger Knox. He was recorded twice more, first in Walgett in 1969 and then in Sydney in 1979 (soon after a report of his death). Songs from these three recordings were released by AIATSIS in 1993 as The Songs of Dougie Young.

Young sang "Cut A Rug", a drinking song from his troubadour days in Wilcannia in the 1950s and 1960s, in both the SBS documentary and accompanying CD, Buried Country: The Story of Aboriginal Country Music.

Young's song The Land Where the Crow Flies Backwards was added to the National Film and Sound Archive's Sounds of Australia registry in 2013.

Discography
 Land Where the Crow Flies Backwards (1965) Wattle
 Dougie Young songs featured in the film "Backroads" (dir: Phillip Noyce 1976)
 The Songs of Dougie Young (1993) AIATSIS

References

External links
Green Left Weekly 11 May 2004 An oral history of the outback
National Library of Australia Dougie Young sings own folk songs . 1963 recording by Dr. Jeremy Beckett
National Library of Australia Dougie Young singing. 1979 recording by Glen Vallance

1930s births
1991 deaths
Australian songwriters
Indigenous Australian musicians
20th-century guitarists
20th-century Australian male singers
Australian male guitarists